USS LST/LST(H)-450 was an  built for the United States Navy during World War II.

Construction
LST-450 was laid down on 10 July 1942, under Maritime Commission (MARCOM) contract, MC hull 970, by  Kaiser Shipyards, Vancouver, Washington; launched on 4 October 1942;  and commissioned on 6 January 1943.

Service history
During World War II, LST-450 was assigned to the Asiatic-Pacific Theater and participated in the following operations: the capture and occupation of Saipan in June and July 1944; the capture and occupation of Tinian in July 1944; and the assault and occupation of Okinawa Gunto April 1945.

Post-war service
Following the war, LST-450 was redesignated LST(H)-450 on 15 September 1945. She performed occupation duty in the Far East until early December 1945. Upon her return to the United States, she was decommissioned on 8 April 1946, and struck from the Navy list on 17 April that same year. On 16 April 1948, the ship was sold to the Bethlehem Steel Co., of Bethlehem, Pennsylvania, and subsequently scrapped.

Awards 
LST-450 earned three battle stars for World War II service.

Notes 

Citations

Bibliography 

Online resources

External links

 

LST-1-class tank landing ships of the United States Navy
Ships built in Vancouver, Washington
1942 ships
World War II amphibious warfare vessels of the United States
S3-M2-K2 ships
Ships of the Aleutian Islands campaign